Annalisa Berta (born 23 July 1952) is an American paleontologist and professor emerita in the Department of Biology at San Diego State University.

The focus of her research is the evolution and fossil history of whales and other marine mammals, and among her contributions is the description of the early pinniped Enaliarctos.

Berta received her Ph.D. from the Department of Paleontology at the University of California, Berkeley in 1979, after which she was a postdoctoral researcher at University of Florida before starting as a faculty member at San Diego State University in 1989. Berta served as president of the Society of Vertebrate Paleontology in 2004-2006 and was elected a Fellow of the American Association for the Advancement of Science (AAAS) in 2015.

References 

American paleontologists
Living people
American taxonomists
Women taxonomists
Women paleontologists
University of California, Berkeley alumni
San Diego State University faculty
Fellows of the American Academy of Arts and Sciences
1952 births